Kayla Klink ( Inlay; born 23 May 1997), is an American professional wrestler. She is currently signed to WWE performing under the ring name Kiana James and is currently one-half of the NXT Women's Tag Team Champions with Fallon Henley in their first reign.

Early life
Klink was born in Sioux City, Iowa. She completed her elementary education at East High School and later graduated from Morningside University in 2019 with a degree in science.

Professional wrestling career

Early career (2021–2022) 
On the September 21, 2021 episode of AEW Dark, Klink made her in-ring debut under the name Xtina Kay, losing to The Bunny.

WWE (2022–present) 
Klink made her WWE debut under the ring name Kayla Inlay on the February 1, 2022 episode of NXT, losing to Sarray. Klink was repackaged as Kiana James and took on a businesswoman gimmick, debuting in the NXT Women's Breakout Tournament on May 17, losing to Roxanne Perez in the first round. James would have her first televised win on the June 24 episode of NXT Level Up by defeating Brooklyn Barlow. On the July 19 episode of NXT, James competed in a 20-woman battle royal to determine the number one contender for the NXT Women's Championship, eliminating Fallon Henley but was eliminated by Nikkita Lyons. James then feuded with Lyons after insulting her looks but lost to her on the August 9 episode of NXT and in a tag match alongside Arianna Grace against Lyons and Zoey Stark on the September 13 episode of NXT. James would have a short feud with Dana Brooke on WWE Main Event, defeating her on November 3. James would start a feud against Henley with whom she would bet her parents' bar against the offer that James offered her. On the November 29 episode of NXT, James defeated Henley. At NXT Deadline, James competed in the Women's Iron Survivor Challenge to determine the number one contender to Mandy Rose's NXT Women's Championship, which was won by Perez. On the December 27 episode of NXT, James ended her feud with Henley after losing to her in a Battle for the Bar.

At New Year's Evil on January 10, 2023, James competed in a 20-woman battle royal to determine the number one contender to Roxanne Perez's NXT Women's Championship, being eliminated by Lyra Valkyria. On February 5, at NXT Vengeance Day, James and Fallon Henley defeated Katana Chance and Kayden Carter to win the NXT Women's Tag Team Championship, making it the first title in James' career.

Championships and accomplishments 
WWE
 NXT Women's Tag Team Championship (1 time, current) – with Fallon Henley

References

External links

 
 
 
 

1998 births
21st-century American women
21st-century professional wrestlers
American female professional wrestlers
Living people
Morningside University alumni
NXT Women's Tag Team Champions
Professional wrestlers from Iowa
Sportspeople from Sioux City, Iowa